Jo Baker is a British writer. She is the author of six novels, including the bestselling Longbourn, a New York Times Notable Book, in development as a feature film with Random House Films and StudioCanal.  She has also written short stories for BBC Radio 4 and reviews for The Guardian and The New York Times Book Review. In 2018, she was awarded a Visiting Fellowship at the Queen's University Belfast, and she is currently an Honorary Fellow at Lancaster University.

Early life and education 
Baker was born and grew up in the village of Arkholme, in Lancashire, England. She was educated at Queen Elizabeth School, Kirkby Lonsdale, and Somerville College, Oxford. She moved to Belfast in 1995 to study for an MA in Irish literature at Queen's University, where she went on to  complete a PhD on the Anglo-Irish novelist Elizabeth Bowen.

Novels 
 Offcomer (2002). Baker's debut novel is set in Belfast in the wake of the Good Friday Agreement, and follows the life of Claire Thomas, a young woman from the North of England. The TLS called it "Quietly yet powerfully moving."
 The Mermaid's Child (2005). A fantastical story of a young girl on a journey across oceans and continents in search of her mother. San Francisco Book Review said: "Malin's world is both darker and brighter than our own world, more disturbing and more enthralling, more frightening and more beautiful. This is a novel worth getting lost in."
 The Telling (2008). A modern-day ghost story told through the eyes of a woman settling her recently deceased mother's affairs. The Daily Telegraph commented: "What Jo Baker has done, with remarkable dexterity, is to make this ghost story intensely intimate; it is a haunting that is all about the struggle to communicate."
 The Picture Book (published in the US as The Undertow) (2011). Set against the rolling backdrop of a century of British history, from the First World War to the "War on Terror", this is a family portrait captured in snapshots. The Financial Times said of it: "Jo Baker is a novelist with a gift for intimate and atmospheric storytelling… Baker skilfully delineates the currents of social change and the essential human drama that persists: the intertwining of love and grief… The result is an agile, keenly observed novel."
 Longbourn (2013). Baker's bestselling novel revisits the events of Jane Austen's Pride and Prejudice, told from the point of view of the servants in the Bennet household. In an interview with BookBrowse, Baker stated that she first read Pride and Prejudice as a child and that her own novel was inspired in part by the fact that her ancestors had been in service. The Daily Express said: "This clever glimpse of Austen's universe through a window clouded by washday steam is so compelling it leaves you wanting to read the next chapter in the lives below stairs." It was selected by The New York Times as one of its 100 Notable Books of 2013, describing it as "a work that's both original and charming, even gripping, in its own right". Longbourn has been translated into twenty-one languages, and was shortlisted for the IBW Book Award.
 A Country Road, A Tree (2016). A fictionalised account of Samuel Beckett's real-life involvement with the French Resistance during the Second World War. The Guardian stated: "It is a daring project, to enter the mind of a man known for his withdrawal and silences, but Baker succeeds triumphantly in prose that is both intimate and austere, with an unobtrusive Beckettian cadence." In an interview with Foyles, she described the process of writing about literary greats such as Beckett and Marcel Duchamp as "really scary", but "utterly irresistible". A Country Road, A Tree was shortlisted for the American Library in Paris Book Award, The James Tait Black Memorial Prize and the Sir Walter Scott Prize for Historical Fiction.   
 The Body Lies (2019). Baker's seventh novel is described as "literary suspense with multiple voices and testimonies" that looks at male violence in fiction and in life. Jane Lawson of Doubleday said: "Jo Baker is a literary chameleon. This novel is utterly compelling." It is published by Doubleday in the UK, and in the USA by Knopf in June 2019.

Longbourn adaptations 
 Film: a cinematic adaptation of Longbourn is due to start filming, directed by Sharon Maguire, screenplay by Jessica Swale, produced by Random House Films and StudioCanal.  
 Radio: the novel was also adapted for radio, appearing on BBC Radio 4's Book at Bedtime, abridged by Sara Davies and read by Sophie Thompson. It was first broadcast in May 2014; and again on Radio 4 Extra in September 2018.

Personal life 
Baker lives in Lancaster with her husband, the playwright and screenwriter Daragh Carville, and their two children.

References

External links 
 Jo Baker's official website

British women novelists
21st-century British women writers
21st-century British novelists
Living people
1973 births
Alumni of Somerville College, Oxford